KASO (1240 AM) is a radio station broadcasting a classic hits format. Licensed to Minden, Louisiana, United States, the station serves the Shreveport–Bossier City metropolitan area.

 The station is located in Minden at 410 Lakeshore Drive on the eastern end of Turner's Pond near the E.S. Richardson Elementary School. It was launched in the early 1950s under the call letters KAPK. For decades, it was owned by Harold Ray "Boe" Cook (1925–1997), a native of Lampasas, Texas, and Manoah Shadrach "Digger" O'Dell Jr. (1926–2016), an Amarillo native. The two assumed  management of KASO in 1961 and 1962, respectively, having come to Minden from Clovis, New Mexico. O'Dell also served four terms on the Webster Parish Police Jury, the parish governing body akin to the county commission in other states. The two were active in community affairs, and O'Dell himself was an accomplished golfer. The station for years stressed local news and offered regular community commentary under the title "Memories of Minden."

In 2013, Richard Chreene and Marvin Davis purchased KASO and sister station KBEF from Robert and Mary Whitaker, the previous owners. The transaction, at a price of $260,000, was consummated on October 23, 2013.

References

External links
Minden Radio Facebook

Radio stations in Louisiana
Classic hits radio stations in the United States
Minden, Louisiana
Radio stations established in 1957
1957 establishments in Louisiana